Chvaleticeite is a monoclinic hexahydrite manganese magnesium sulfate mineral with formula: (Mn2+, Mg)[SO4]·6(H2O). It occurs in the oxidized zone of manganese silicate deposits with pyrite and rhodochrosite that have undergone regional and contact metamorphism. It is defined as the manganese dominant member of the  hexahydrite group.

Chvaleticeite is named after the city Chvaletice, Bohemia, in the Czech Republic. Chvaleticeite and minerals like it have been studied for their hydrogen bonding and incongruent melting properties as they are predicted to form in the relative environments of Mars and other bodies in the solar system.

Structure
The structure in chvaleticeite is made by hydrogen bonding in metallic sulfates. Due to the minute grain size of chvaleticeite, typical single crystal methods could not be used. Through analogy with hexahydrite the Guinier powder diffraction method was used to identify the following structural parameters: space group C 2/c, a = 10.05(2) Å, b = 7.24(2) Å, c = 24.3(1) Å; β = 98.0(2)°, V = 1754 Å3, Z = 8, Dx = 1.84 g·cm−3; a : b : c = 1.3881 : 1 : 3.3564.

Composition
Chvaleticeite has an empirical formula of (Mn2+, Mg)[SO4]·6(H2O) and is a member of the hexahydrite group with the space group C2/c. Chemical analysis was carried out using classical chemical methods. Sulfate was determined gravimetrically, MnO was determined using titration, MgO was determined by EDTA titration and CaO, Fe2O3, K2O and Na2O using AAS. The H2O was determined by the modified Penfield method. The performed analysis produced the following result: MnO 15.81, MgO 6.41, CaO 0.04, FeO traces, Fe2O3 0.10, Al2O3 traces, K2O 0.005, Na2O 0.011, SO3 31.48, P2O5 traces, H2O+ 0.37, H2O- 45.22, insoluble residue 0.36, sum 99.81 weight percent.

Occurrence
Chvaleticeite was discovered in a sulfate paragenesis in the oxidation zone of the Upper Proterozoic volcanogenic massive sulfide ore deposit of pyrite-manganese ores at Chvaletice. It was found in association with melanterite (it can form by partial dehydration), Mg-jokouite, Mg-ilesite, rozenite, copiapite and gypsum. This paragenesis allows heptahydrates and tetrahydrates to dominate over pentahydrates and hexahydrates. Chvaleticeite is completely soluble in water.

References

 Bauer, W.H. (1962) Zur Krisallchemie der Salzhydrate. Die Kristallstrukturen von (Mn, Mg)SO4x6H2O(Leonhardit) und FeSO4x4H2O(Rozenit). Acta Crystallogr., 15, 815-826.
 Bernard, J.H. et al. (1981) Petrology and geochemistry of the Upper Proterozoic Fe-Mn deposits Chvaletice, Mineralogie Ceskoslovenska – 2nd ed., Academia, Praha. Chab, J. et al. (1986)(Bohemia, Czechoslovakia). – Sbor. Geol. Ved, Lozisk. Geol. Miner., 23 118 69, Praha.
 Blake, A., Cooke, P., Hubberstey, P., and Sampson, C. (2001) Zinc(II) sulphate tetrahydrate. Acta Crystallographica E, 57, i109–i111.
 Jennifer L. Anderson et al. (2012) The atomic structure of deuterated boyleite ZnSO4·4D2O, ilesite MnSO4·4D2O, and bianchite ZnSO4·6D2O, American Mineralogist Volume 97, 1905–1914.
 Kellersohn, T. (1992) Structure of Cobalt Sulfate Tetrahydrate. Acta Crystallogr. C48, 776±779.
 Palache, C., H. Berman, and C. Frondel (1951) Dana’s system of mineralogy, (7th edition), II, 486-487.
Petr Ondrus, Frantiesk Veselovsky, Jan Hlousek. Et al (1997) Secondary minerals of the Jachymov (Joachimsthal) ore district: Journal of the Czech Geological Society., 12 16 17 18.
 R.C. Peterson et al. (2007) Meridianiite: A new mineral species observed on Earth and predicted to exist on Mars, American Mineralogist Volume 92, 1756-1759.

Sulfate minerals
Monoclinic minerals
Minerals in space group 15